Pouteria rigidopsis is a species of plant in the family Sapotaceae. It is endemic to Venezuela.

References

Flora of Venezuela
rigidopsis
Near threatened plants
Taxonomy articles created by Polbot